Las Caobas is a place located in the municipality Santo Domingo Oeste, in the Dominican Republic. Its geographical coordinates are 19° 35' 0" North, 70° 14' 0" West.

References

Populated places in Santo Domingo Province